3DCrafter (previously 3D Canvas) is a real-time 3D modelling and animation tool developed by Amabilis Software. A Canadian software company. It is available in 3 different versions - 3DCrafter, 3DCrafter Plus, and 3DCrafter Pro. 3DCrafter is freeware, whereas the Plus and Pro upgrades cost. The software is designed to be user friendly, and has an easy to use drag and drop interface. 3DCrafter is written in C# and uses Direct3D 11.

3DCrafter Pro 
The paid variant of the freeware, it offers a wider options in both import formats and export formats. It also supports additional operations that are not available in the free version, like boolean operation and animation operation. It also includes a built-in rendering engine.

References

External links 
 Official Amabilis website

3D graphics software